"Sons and Daughters of Saint Lucia" is the national anthem of Saint Lucia. The lyrics were written by Charles Jesse and the music by Leton Felix Thomas. It was adopted in 1967 when the country achieved self-government from the United Kingdom and was confirmed as the official national anthem upon Saint Lucia's independence in 1979.

Lyrics

References

External links

  Protocol for the National Anthem of Saint Lucia
 Official website of the government of Saint Lucia
 Vocal recording
 National anthem of Saint Lucia MIDI
 The Designers (Saint Lucia National Symbols)

National anthems
National symbols of Saint Lucia
Saint Lucian music
North American anthems
National anthem compositions in B-flat major